The Parliamentary Boroughs (England), Stamp Duty Act 1838 (1 & 2 Vict. c. 35) was an Act of Parliament in the United Kingdom, signed into law on 4 July 1838. It repealed the stamp duty payable on the admission of freemen by birth or servitude in city or borough constituencies.

References
The British almanac of the Society for the Diffusion of Useful Knowledge, for the year 1839. The Society for the Diffusion of Useful Knowledge, London, 1839.

1838 in British law
United Kingdom Acts of Parliament 1838
Acts of the Parliament of the United Kingdom concerning England
1838 in England